Tomaccio tomatoes resulted from a 12-year breeding program using a wild Peruvian tomato species. The program was developed by Hishtil in Israel. Tomaccio is a vigorous, high yielding, early fruiting cherry tomato bred primarily for the sun-dried tomato market.

References

agriculture in Israel
tomato cultivars